Sir Alexander Campbell  (March 9, 1822 – May 24, 1892) was an English-born, Upper Canadian statesman and a father of Canadian Confederation.

Life
Born in Hedon, Yorkshire, he was brought to Canada by his father, who was a doctor, when he was one year old.  He was educated in French at St. Hyacinthe in Quebec and in the grammar school at Kingston, Ontario.  Campbell studied law and was called to the bar in 1843.  He became a partner in John A. Macdonald's law office.

Campbell was a Freemason of St. John's Lodge, No. 3 (Ontario) of Kingston (now The Ancient St. John's No. 3). When the government was moved to Quebec in 1858, Campbell resigned.

He was elected to the Legislative Council of the Province of Canada in 1858 and 1864, and served as the last Commissioner of Crown Lands 30 March 1864 – 30 June 1867. He attended the Charlottetown Conference and the Quebec City Conference in 1864, and at Confederation was appointed to the Senate of Canada. He later held a number of ministerial posts in the Cabinet of Prime Minister John A. Macdonald and was the sixth Lieutenant Governor of Ontario from 1887 to 1892.

Historian Ged Martin revealed the reason why Campbell never achieved first rank as a politician; he was lame and suffered from epileptic seizures, and his estranged wife was a certified lunatic (see Family section below)

In 1883, he built his home on Metcalfe Street, Ottawa, now known as "Campbell House".

He died in office in Toronto in 1892, and was buried at Cataraqui Cemetery in Kingston, Ontario.

Campbell Crescent in Kingston, a street in the Portsmouth municipal district, is named in his honour.

Family
In 1855, Campbell married Georgina Frederica Locke, daughter of Thomas Sandwith of Beverley, Yorkshire, and a niece of Humphrey Sandwith III (1792–1874) of Bridlington. As Ged Martin has detailed in an article on Campbell's private life, the marriage was a failure and his estranged wife spent time in asylums as a certified lunatic. He left two sons (the eldest was Charles Sandwith Campbell) and three daughters.

References

External links 
 
 
 Ged Martin, Alexander Campbell (1822-1892): The Travails of a Father of Confederation | https://www.gedmartin.net/published-work-mainmenu-11/249-alexander-campbell-1822-1892-the-travails-of-a-father-of-confederation. Published in Ontario History (Spring 2013) https://www.erudit.org/en/journals/onhistory/2013-v105-n1-onhistory03918/1050744ar/
 Humphrey Sandwith
 
 
 
Alexander Campbell fonds, Archives of Ontario
 Ged Martin, Alexander Campbell (1822-1892): Travails of a Father of Confederation https://www.gedmartin.net/published-work-mainmenu-11/249-alexander-campbell-1822-1892-the-travails-of-a-father-of-confederation

1822 births
1892 deaths
Anglo-Scots
Canadian senators from Ontario
Canadian people of Scottish descent
English emigrants to pre-Confederation Ontario
English Anglicans
Fathers of Confederation
Conservative Party of Canada (1867–1942) senators
Canadian Knights Commander of the Order of St Michael and St George
Canadian King's Counsel
Lieutenant Governors of Ontario
Members of the Legislative Council of the Province of Canada
Members of the King's Privy Council for Canada
People from Hedon
People from Kingston, Ontario
Postmasters General of Canada
Anglophone Quebec people
Persons of National Historic Significance (Canada)
Immigrants to Upper Canada
Canadian Freemasons